Koumbal  is a village in Vakaga Prefecture, Central African Republic.

History 
LRA attacked Koumbal twice in 2010. The first attack occurred on 27 September and LRA kidnapped seven villagers. The second attack happened on 26 October, in which LRA abducted four civilians and looted the village's goods.

Facilities 
Koumbal has one public health post and one school.

References 

Populated places in Vakaga